Line S5 is a planned rapid transit line connecting Nanjing and Yangzhou. Initially 4 car Type A trains will be used but the line is designed for expansion to 6 car trains in the future. The line will have passing loops at select stations allowing for express and local services to be offered. Local services are expected to take 45 minutes to run end to end and express services will shorten end to end travel times to 34 minutes. Construction started on December 28, 2021. The line is planned to open in 2026.

Stations

References 

Nanjing Metro lines